The Friends of Ted Festival, or Ted Fest, is an annual fan convention held on the island of Inishmore, off the coast of County Galway, Ireland for fans of the Channel 4 sitcom Father Ted, created by Graham Linehan and Arthur Mathews. The series was set on the fictional Craggy Island off Ireland's west coast, so Ted Fest is also held on such an island. In 2010 the festival expanded to an Australian edition, which was held in Parkes, New South Wales.

Festivals by year

2007

Events

A number of events took place at the festival, each themed in association with the comedy series.

 Best Episode - The best Father Ted episode was determined by those who attended this year's festival. The winner was "New Jack City".
 Father Jack Cocktail Evening
 Father Dougal Breakfast Movie Charades
 Lovely Girls Contest and Charity Auction (inspired by "Rock-a-Hula Ted")
 Crazy Golf (inspired by "Entertaining Father Stone")
 Hide A Nun and Seek
 Ludo Aerobics
 Buckaroo Speed Dating
 Ferrero Rocher Quiz Night

A Song for Europe
This is a parody of the episode "Song for Europe".

The 2007 Inis Mór Song for Europe is "Jack in the Box" by OK Chorale.
Songwriters Peadar and Geordan joined the festival on Inis Mor on Sunday 25 February to record the song live accompanied by the Craggy Island Singers. According to the official website, the OK Chorale was formed following "a bizarre boating accident", in which "a skiff containing two Christy Moore impersonators, fleeing from an ugly scene at the Tory Island singing festival, became hopelessly lost and collided with a fishing boat entering Teelin Harbour. The ensuing brawl developed into a lengthy drinking session in the nearby Rusty Mackerel, where the men discovered their mutual enthusiasm for (a) The Eurovision Song Contest and (b) the music and legs of Clodagh Rodgers."

Toilet Duck Comedy Awards
This is a parody of the Golden Cleric award featured in "A Christmassy Ted".

On Wednesday 21 February at the Kings Head in County Galway eight of Ireland's up and coming comedians competed for a place in the final at Ted Fest 2007 on Inis Mór.
The final took place in the Aran Islands Hotel on the Friday of the festival, attended by special guest Michael Redmond (the actor who played Father Stone from the series).
The prize for the Kings Head Toilet Duck Award is €1,000, an appearance at the Cork Comedy Festival and a golden duck.
The 2007 winner was Sharon Mannion and the 2008 winner was Bob Hennigan. The winner in 2010 was Gerry McBride.

Football match
This is a parody of the "All-Priests Five-a-Side Over-75's Indoor Football Challenge Match" featured in the episode "Escape from Victory".

A football match between the two islands to commemorate the game that featured in the series. Former Republic of Ireland footballers Tony Cascarino and John Aldridge were opposing captains, whilst celebrity referee Pierluigi Collina sailed to Inis Mór to referee the one-off tie. The match took place on the beach on the final day of the festival. The winning island side, (Inis Mór by 2-0) was declared "The Real Craggy Island" for the coming year. Inis Oirr received the title of "Rugged Island". The captains on the day were Padraig Ó Flaithearta (Inis Mor) and Mairtin Seoighe (Inis Oirr), and the goalscorers were Adam Clark and Cillian Joyce.

2008
Ted Fest 2008 featured separate events on the island of Inishmore  and on the mainland at Kilfenora, County Clare  (site of Parochial House external shots in the series). The Craggy Island World Cup was expanded to admit all islands of Ireland.

2009
The third Ted Fest was spread over two weekends. The Pink Flamingos took the third Craggy Cup (non-island teams being permitted for the first time), while, in a bizarre coincidence, the Toilet Duck Comedy Award was won by a genuine ex-priest named FJ Murray.

2010
Tickets for the fourth Ted Fest went on sale in September 2009. The first weekend took place on Inishmore and the second on Inisheer. A parallel Ted Fest Oz took place in Parkes, New South Wales, Australia during the Easter Triduum, however it was not a success, the local police removing its liquor licence due to noise levels.

2011

The fifth Ted Fest took place on Inishmore from 24 to 27 February 2011. Scheduled events include a Lovely Girls pageant, "Ted's Got Talent" (a parody of Britain's Got Talent), the Ronnie Drew Hour,
a Virtual Confession Box, a Craggy Island Kill Bill Festival, the Father Ted Prizeless Quiz, the Craggy Cup, "Matchmaking with Nellie," a Pirate Cruise and a walking tour to the Amish community.

Ted Fest V also featured a video blog by one of Dermot Morgan's sons, Rob Morgan, which gave an Access All Areas look at some of the many events at Ted Fest.

Festival summary

References

External links
 Ted Fest site
 Friends of Ted website
 irelandwest.ie article
 entertainment.ie article
 BBC article: Craggy islands row over Father Ted
 Guardian article: In the name of the Fathers
 Site on paddypower.com
 The Ray Foley Show live at TedFest 2007 (video)

Father Ted
Fan conventions
Recurring events established in 2007
2007 establishments in Ireland